The Making of Bobby Burnit is a lost 1914 American silent drama film directed by Oscar Apfel and written by George Randolph Chester and Winchell Smith. The film stars Edward Abeles, Bessie Barriscale, Howard Hickman, George Hernandez, Theodore Roberts and Sydney Deane. It was released on September 17, 1914, by Paramount Pictures.

Plot

Cast 
Edward Abeles as Bobby Burnit
Bessie Barriscale as Agnes Elliston
Howard Hickman as Daniel Johnson
George Hernandez as David Applerod
Theodore Roberts as Sam Stone
Sydney Deane as Silas Trimmer
William Elmer as Biff Bates
Robert Dunbar as Lawyer

References

External links 
 

1914 films
1910s English-language films
Silent American drama films
1914 drama films
Lost American films
Paramount Pictures films
Films directed by Oscar Apfel
American black-and-white films
American silent feature films
1914 lost films
Lost drama films
1910s American films
English-language drama films